This is a 2021 timeline of events in the Somali Civil War (2009–present).

March 

 5 March 2021, a suicide car bombing occurred outside Luul Yemeni restaurant in Mogadishu. The attack killed at least 20 people and injured another 30.

June 

 15 June 2021, a suicide bombing occurred in Mogadishu. It happened at the General Dhegobadan Military Camp, where the bomber killed 15 army recruits.

November 

 25 November 2021, in Mogadishu, a suicide bomber in a sport utility vehicle killed eight people and wounded 17 others, including teachers and pupils at Mocaasir Primary and Secondary School, which was heavily damaged.

See also 

 Somali Civil War (2009–present)

References 

2021 in Somalia
Conflicts in 2021
Somali Civil War (2009–present) by year
Lists of armed conflicts in 2021